Oakdale is an unincorporated community in Shelby County, in the U.S. state of Missouri.

History
A post office called "Oak Dale" was established in 1878, and remained in operation until 1905. The area was descriptively named.

References

Unincorporated communities in Shelby County, Missouri
Unincorporated communities in Missouri